After the Rain may refer to:

Film and television
After the Rain (film), a 1999 film by Takashi Koizumi
After the Rain (TV series), a 2000 Iranian series
After the Rain (TV special), a 2009 Christmas special by Regine Velasquez
After the Rain (Amphibia), an episode of Amphibia

Literature
After the Rain (manga), a 2014 manga series by Jun Mayuzuki
After the Rain, a 1958 novel by John Bowen
After the Rain (play), a 1966 play by Bowen based on his novel
After the Rain, a 1987 children's novel by Norma Fox Mazer

Music 
After the Rain (ballet), a 2005 ballet by Christopher Wheeldon to music by Arvo Pärt
After the Rain (duo), a Japanese male musical group

Albums
After the Rain (Aaron & Amanda Crabb album) or the title song, 2007
After the Rain (Bellefire album), 2001
After the Rain (Irma Thomas album), 2006
After the Rain (John McLaughlin album) or the title song, 1994
After the Rain (Muddy Waters album), 1969
After the Rain (Nelson album) or the title song, 1990
After the Rain (Side Effect album), 1980
After the Rain (Terje Rypdal album) or the title song, 1976
After the Rain, by Benjamin Francis Leftwich, 2016
After the Rain, by Michael Jones, 1988
After the Rain, by Michel Legrand, 1983
After the Rain, by the Underachievers, 2018

Songs
"After the Rain" (The Angels song), 1978
"After the Rain" (Nelson song), from After the Rain, 1990
"After the Rain", by Blue Rodeo from Casino, 1990
"After the Rain", by Bruce Cockburn from Dancing in the Dragon's Jaws, 1979
"After the Rain", by the Comsat Angels from Fiction, 1982
"After the Rain", by John Coltrane from Impressions, 1963
"After the Rain", by Nickelback from Feed the Machine, 2017
"After the Rain", by Titiyo, 1989